is a Japanese photographer.

Ono was born in Akita Prefecture. She studied interior design at Tama Geijutsu Gakuen (an affiliate of Tama Art University that closed in 1992), graduating in 1991 to work as a designer. She stayed in France from 1995 to '96, returning to work again as a designer but pursuing photography in her spare time.

In 1997 her portfolio of black-and-white photographs of manhole covers and the like in Paris, Un curriculum vitæ, was exhibited at the Tokyo Metropolitan Museum of Photography and won a special prize in the second Tokyo International Photo-Biennale (Dainikai Tōkyō Kokusai Shashin Biennāre).

With her husband, Grégoire Dentan, Ono runs a design company, Atelier Grizou.

Published work
Tōkyō Kokusai Shashin Biennāre: Dainikai: Sono tayōsei o megutte. Tokyo: Tokyo Metropolitan Museum of Photography, 1997.

References
Kasahara Michiko. "Ono Chizu". Nihon shashinka jiten / 328 Outstanding Japanese Photographers. Kyoto: Tankōsha, 2000. . P.83.  Despite the English-language alternative title, all in Japanese.

Japanese photographers
Artists from Akita Prefecture
1970 births
Living people
20th-century women photographers
21st-century Japanese women photographers